Federal stimulus may refer to:

Economic Stimulus Act of 2008
American Recovery and Reinvestment Act of 2009
2009 Canadian federal budget